Abishag ( Avishag) was a beautiful young woman of Shunem chosen to be a helper and servant to King David in his old age. Among Abishag's duties was to lie next to David and pass along her body heat and vigor because "they put covers on him, but he could not get warm". 1 Kings 1:4 notes that David did not engage in sexual intercourse with her. When brought to David, she was a na'arah, which indicates youth or virginity but not necessarily both.

After David's death, Adonijah (David's fourth and eldest surviving son) persuaded Bathsheba, King Solomon's mother, to entreat the king to permit him to marry Abishag. Solomon suspected in this request an aspiration to the throne, since Abishag was considered David's concubine, and so ordered Adonijah's assassination (1 Kings 2:17–25). In the earlier story of Absalom's rebellion, it is noted that having sexual relations with the former king's concubine is a way of proclaiming oneself to be the new king. Adonijah may have asked to marry her at the suggestion of his mother.

Some scholars point to the possibility that Abishag is the female protagonist in the Song of Songs.

Later Jewish midrashic and Christian traditions paid little attention to Abishag's role. Abishag's experiences have provided inspiration for contemporary writers including Rainer Maria Rilke, Itzik Manger, Louise Gluck and Shirley Kaufman. Abishag's name, although not her story, is invoked to begin Robert Frost's poem "Provide, Provide."

See also 
 Shunamitism
 Avishag Semberg (born 2001), Israeli taekwondo Olympic bronze medalist

References

- External links 

 
 

10th-century BC women
10th-century BCE Hebrew people
Books of Kings people
Women in the Hebrew Bible
People associated with David